Devolver is the second studio album from ex-Reuben frontman Jamie Lenman. It was released on 27 October 2017 by Big Scary Monsters. The album has been described as the "most eclectic albums of his career to date" blending together a wide variety of musical styles and elements.

The album was announced alongside the release of the single Hell in a Fast Car as well as the announcement of the all-day festival curated and headlined by Lenman at The Dome, Tufnell Park called 'Lenmania.'

Content 
The album uses a heavier emphasis on electronic instrumentation than Lenman's previous releases. “I've been trying to put electronic blips, beeps and beats into my music ever since the second Reuben album. We were all very big fans of Nine Inch Nails and Soulwax, so we were keen to try and push those influences into our music at the time," Lenman said in an interview with The Independent Many noted Lenman's references to his previous material including the refrain to Mississippi which was previously used on the song 'Shotgun House' on his previous album Muscle Memory.

Many praised Lenman's blending of genres and described it as more concise as focused than it was on his previous record.

Track listing

Personnel 
Credits adapted from the album's liner notes.
Jamie Lenman -  vocals, guitar, bass guitar
Dan Kavanagh -  drums, backing vocals
Dominique Fraser - backing vocals (track 4)
Kathryn Lenman - backing vocals (track 4)
Evan Fromreide - recording engineer
Vince Welch - recording engineer
Barbara Bartikowski - strings
Space - producer, keyboards, backing vocals
Pete Maher - mastering engineer

Design
Scott Chalmers - photography
Black Futures - photography (snapshots)

References 

Jamie Lenman albums
2017 albums